Desperate Remedies: Psychiatry's Turbulent Quest to Cure Mental Illness by sociologist Andrew Scull is a critical history of two hundred years of treatment of mental disorders in the United States. From the "birth of the asylum" in the 1830's to the drug trials and genetic studies of the 2000's, Scull catalogues efforts by psychoanalysts, psychologists, neuroscientists and social reformers to diagnose and treat mental maladies.

Overview
Scull maps out the progression of the treatment of mental disorders, beginning in the late 19th century with state asylums or state hospitals whose inhabitants, “poor and the friendless”, reached a population of half a million by 1950. The wealthy, on the other hand, got treated at home with often dangerous substances such as morphine and strychnine. Scull details the personalities and progress behind other treatments like Hydrotherapy, electrotherapy, insulin shock therapy, injections of Camphor, Metrazol, electroconvulsive or “shock” therapy, as well as frequently deadly surgical interventions such as colectomy, and lobotomy. He also explores the progression of disease models from humorism to the biochemical model of mental illness, and the advent of psychopharmacology and the development and travails of the Diagnostic and Statistical Manual of Mental Disorders.

Reception
Initial reaction was positive amongst legacy media. Richard McNally called the book "an indisputable masterpiece" in the Wall Street Journal. Rebecca Lawrence of the Guardian said it was, "meticulously researched and beautifully written, and even funny at times, despite the harrowing content."

See also
 Anti-psychiatry
 Michel Foucault
 History of mental disorders
 History of psychiatry
 R. D. Laing
 Thomas Szasz

References

External links 
 Desperate Remedies: Psychiatry's Turbulent Quest to Cure Mental Illness at Harvard University Press

2022 non-fiction books
English-language books
History of psychiatry
Philosophy textbooks
Belknap Press books
Allen Lane (imprint) books